The Chinese Elm cultivar Ulmus parvifolia 'Hallelujah' is one of three  American introductions made circa 1992 that were selected for their cold hardiness (USA zone 4 tolerant). 'Hallelujah' is known to have withstood -37 °C (-35 °F) in Missouri.

Description
The tree is fast growing, and reputed to have very attractive foliage and bark.

Pests and diseases
The species and its cultivars are highly resistant, but not immune, to Dutch elm disease, and unaffected by the Elm Leaf Beetle Xanthogaleruca luteola.

Cultivation
'Hallelujah' is extremely rare in cultivation beyond North America.

Accessions

North America
Brenton Arboretum, Dallas Center, Iowa, US. No details available.
Dawes Arboretum, US. , Newark, Ohio, US. 2 trees, no acc. details available.
Morton Arboretum, US. Acc. nos. , .

Europe
Grange Farm Arboretum, Sutton St James, Spalding, Lincolnshire, UK. Acc. no. 1086.

References

External links
http://www.ces.ncsu.edu/depts/hort/consumer/factsheets/trees-new/cultivars/ulmus_parvifolia.htm Ulmus parvifolia cultivar list.

Chinese elm cultivar
Ulmus articles missing images
Ulmus